Question of Gravity is an adventure for fantasy role-playing games published by Mayfair Games in 1982.

Contents
Question of Gravity is a scenario for character levels 2-5, a dungeon adventure.  The dungeon and a nearby village are described.  The adventure is advertised as also suitable for use with Dungeons & Dragons and Tunnels & Trolls.

Publication history
Question of Gravity was written by Jerome Mooney, with a cover by Janny Wurts, and was published by Mayfair Games in 1982 as a 24-page book.

Reception
Lawrence Schick in his book Heroic Worlds describes the dungeon as "a bizarre Escherlike cubical structure".

Reviews

References

Fantasy role-playing game adventures
Role Aids
Role-playing game supplements introduced in 1982